Idhu Sathiyam is a 1963 Indian Tamil-language drama film directed by K. Shankar. The film stars S. A. Ashokan and K. Chandrakantha. It was released on 30 August 1963. The film was remade in Hindi as Shehzada (1972).

Plot

Cast 
List adapted from Thiraikkalanjiyam – Part 2.

Male cast
S. A. Ashokan
T. S. Balaiah
T. S. Durairaj
Nagayya
G.K. Nagesh
S. V. Ramadas
A. Veerappan

Female cast
K. Chandrakantha
P. Kannamba
Sri Ranjani
Manorama
Sivakami
Mathavi
 Hema Malini (special appearance in the song "Singari")

Production 
The film was produced by G. N. Velumani under his own banner Saravana Pictures and was directed by K. Shankar. The story was written by Ra. Ki. Rangarajan. Screenplay and dialogues were written by Ma. Lakshmanan. Cinematography was handled by Thambu while the editing was done by K. Narayanan. Balu was in charge of art direction while the choreography was done by S. M. Rajkumar. R. P. Sarathy did the still photography and the film was shot at Studio Neptune. Hema Malini, who later became a leading Bollywood actress, made her acting debut with this film, appearing as a dancer in the song "Singari".

Soundtrack 
Music was composed by the duo Viswanathan–Ramamoorthy and the lyrics were penned by Kannadasan.

Reception 
T. M. Ramachandran wrote in Sport and Pastime, "Producer G N Velumani and director K Shankar have shaped the film in a praise-worthy manner There are of course flaws here and there but the good points outweigh the bad". Kanthan of Kalki said there was nothing special about the screenplay.

References

External links 

1960s Tamil-language films
1963 drama films
1963 films
Films directed by K. Shankar
Films scored by Viswanathan–Ramamoorthy
Indian drama films
Tamil films remade in other languages